Valik is a village in Babol County, Mazandaran Province, Iran.

Valik may also refer to:
 Valik-e Olya, Amol County
 Valik-e Sofla, Amol County
 Bala Valik, Babol County
 Valik Takht, Babol County
 Valik Bon, Sari County
 Valik Chal, Sari County